The 1856 Atlantic hurricane season featured six tropical cyclones, five of which made landfall. The first system, Hurricane One, was first observed in the Gulf of Mexico on August 9. The final storm, Hurricane Six, was last observed on September 22. These dates fall within the period with the most tropical cyclone activity in the Atlantic. Only two tropical cyclones during the season existed simultaneously. One of the cyclones has only a single known point in its track due to a sparsity of data. Operationally, another tropical cyclone was believed to have existed in the Wilmington, North Carolina area in September, but HURDAT – the official Atlantic hurricane database – excludes this system. Another tropical cyclone that existed over the Northeastern United States in mid-August was later added to HURDAT.

Four tropical cyclones reached hurricane status, including two which became major hurricanes, Category 3 or higher on the modern-day Saffir–Simpson hurricane wind scale. However, in the absence of modern satellite and other remote-sensing technologies, only storms that affected populated land areas or encountered ships at sea are currently known, so the actual total could be higher. An undercount bias of zero to four cyclones per year between 1886 and 1910 has been estimated. The strongest cyclone of the season, the first hurricane, peaked at Category 4 strength with  winds. Known as the 1856 Last Island hurricane, it brought devastation to southern Louisiana. More than 200 people were killed after a storm surge submerged Last Island, making it one of the deadliest hurricanes in Louisiana history. Hurricane Two brought heavy rains and squalls to Barbados and Grenada, causing "considerable" damage. Tropical Storms Three and Four had a minor impact on the Northeastern United States and Cuba, respectively. Additionally, Hurricane Five caused four deaths in Inagua, Bahamas and had a minor impact on Cuba and the United States.

The season's activity was reflected with a low accumulated cyclone energy (ACE) rating of 49. 


Timeline

Systems

Hurricane One

The Last Island Hurricane of 1856

On August 9, a minimal hurricane was observed near the Dry Tortugas. The storm moved northwestward and strengthened, becoming a Category 2 hurricane about 12 hours later. The hurricane reached Category 3 strengthened late on August 9. It continued to deepen and became a Category 4 hurricane on the following day. Simultaneously, the storm made landfall in Last Island, Louisiana. It rapidly weakened inland and fell to tropical storm intensity on August 11. The system then drifted northeastward, until dissipating over Mississippi early on August 12.

Offshore, at least 183 people drowned after steamers and schooners sunk in rough seas produced by the hurricane. A storm surge between  lashed Last Island, Louisiana. The island was completely submerged, with virtually every structure destroyed, including the hotels and casinos, while all crops were ruined. Additionally, Last Island itself split in two. Inland, heavy rainfall caused the Mermentau River to oveflow, destroying crops and every house in Abbeville. In Plaquemines Parish, rice fields were under several feet of water, while many orange trees lost their fruit. The storm resulted in at least 200 fatalities, making it one of the deadliest tropical cyclones in the history of Louisiana.

Hurricane Two

The cyclone tracked due westward and crossed Grenada, before entering the eastern Caribbean. Heavy rain and squalls were reported in Barbados and Grenada. This system was last noted near La Orchila, Venezuela on August 14.

Tropical Storm Three

The storm traveled north and emerged into the Chesapeake Bay near Norfolk, Virginia. The storm continued travelling northward just offshore of the east coast of the US before finally dissipating off Rhode Island on August 21. Heavy rains and strong winds were reported in Connecticut, Massachusetts, New York, and Washington, D.C. This system was known as the Charter Oak Storm, because it felled the famed Charter Oak in Hartford, Connecticut.

Tropical Storm Four

A limited number of sources indicate that a tropical storm was briefly active in the vicinity of Havana, Cuba on August 21. The storm probably originated from the Bahamas.

Hurricane Five

The Southeastern States Hurricane of 1856

A hurricane formed north of Hispaniola on August 25. It moved westward, passing over the Inagua Islands before striking the north coast of Cuba as a Category 2 hurricane on August 27. The cyclone weakened to Category 1 strength as it crossed the island, close to Matanzas, but regained first Category 2 and then Category 3 strength as it moved north through the Gulf of Mexico. The cyclone made landfall near Panama City, Florida, on August 31 as a Category 2 hurricane. Thereafter, it then quickly weakened to a tropical storm while moving northward through Georgia and South Carolina. The storm entered the Atlantic from the state of Virginia on next day and dissipated on September 3.

The hurricane destroyed thirty houses on Inagua and four people died there. Several vessels were run ashore on the Cuban coast. In Florida, high tides were reported along the coast. The SS Florida was tossed ashore at St. Joseph Bay and completely destroyed, while streets were inundated with water in Apalachicola. Inland, strong winds and heavy winds brought very damage inland, especially at Marianna, which was considered "a wreak." In Key West, it was reported that the hurricane completely washed away all of the island above water. In Georgia, flooding damaged numerous bridges, dams, and corn and cotton crop fields. Many streets and sidewalks in Columbus were blocked by falling trees. At Norfolk, Virginia, on September 1, the spire of a church was blown down by the storm.

Hurricane Six

The storm decelerated and remained at this intensity for over 24 hours. Late on September 21, the system re-curved westward and weakened to a tropical storm.

See also

 List of tropical cyclones
 Atlantic hurricane season

References

 
Atlantic hurricane seasons
1856 natural disasters
1856 in the United States
Articles which contain graphical timelines
1856 meteorology